Leptocypris weeksii is a species of cyprinid fish found in the lower Congo River, the central and upper Congo River basin, and Pool Malebo in the Democratic Republic of Congo.

References

Leptocypris
Danios
Fish of Africa
Fish described in 1899